Qué pobres tan ricos, is a Mexican telenovela produced by Rosy Ocampo and broadcast by Canal de las Estrellas. It is based on Colombian telenovela Pobres Rico.

Jaime Camil and Zuria Vega star as the protagonists; with Arturo Peniche as the co-protagonist; while Mark Tacher, Ingrid Martz, Tiare Scanda and the first actress Raquel Pankowsky star as the main antagonists, with the participation of Sylvia Pasquel, Manuel "Flaco" Ibáñez, and the first actress Queta Lavat.

As of November 11, 2013, Las Estrellas started broadcasting Qué pobres tan ricos weeknights at 20:25, replacing Libre para amarte. The last episode was broadcast on June 29, 2014, with Mi corazón es tuyo replacing it the following day.

Univision broadcast Qué pobres tan ricos from January 6, 2014, weeknights at 22:00, replacing one hour of Lo que la vida me robó. The last episode was broadcast on August 24, 2014, with La malquerida replacing it the following day.

As February 6, 2017, Tlnovelas broadcasts Qué pobres tan ricos at 07:00, 13:00 and 19:00 and later 09:50, 15:40 and 21:30 Replacing Por ella soy Eva. The Last episode broadcast on September 29, 2017, with Hasta que el dinero nos separe replacing it the following day.

The finale of Qué pobres tan ricos averaged 3.9 million viewers on Univision.

Plot
María Guadalupe "Lupita" Menchaca Martínez is a single mother, living  with her son, alongside the rest of her family —- father, brother, and sister in a typical middle-class neighborhood in Mexico City. Miguel Ángel Ruizpalacios Romagnoli is a perfect exponent of the upper class. He is a millionaire and has no problem in sight. He lives on rumba, gambling and women and it doesn't matter what happens to the company of which he is president by inheritance. Lupita and Miguel Ángel do not know each other and seemingly have nothing in common. Their worlds are different, their social classes do not cross and their personalities have little to do with each other. However, destiny is responsible for crossing them so unexpectedly.

Victim of a trap of his cousin Alejo, who wants to be the president of the company, Miguel Ángel is accused of using the company's money to launder assets and a current account of incoming non-holy money. Miguel Ángel is not only wanted by the police, but his life and that of the Ruizpalacios family changes from one day to the next: all the accounts closed, Miguel's assets are seized, and if he does not appear, they are to be considered fugitives from justice.

Desperate and without knowing whom to turn to, Miguel Ángel decides to listen to his grandmother Matilde, who claims that they own land on the outskirts of the city that his grandfather once bought.
With intentions to sell them and to make off cash money, Miguel Ángel undertakes the crusade of recovering them facing the Menchaca, the family that lives there and assures to own the place that they once bought from his grandfather.
As there is no evidence of either, nor of the other the Ruizpalacios have no other choice but to settle down to live with the Menchaca, in what is the only house with which they have, as well as a restaurant and a hall of events.
The meeting of these two worlds is very comical. First, because the Ruizpalacios do not understand how the Menchaca live. If you have your own room with a private bathroom, the Ruizpalacios spend the night sleeping together in cabin beds and sharing a single bathroom among the more than 10 people who live in the house.
Secondly, because in their life they never worked and now they will have to survive in some way, learning the activities that the Menchaca develop, for them, one more humiliating than the other.

Thirdly because Miguel Ángel is nothing more and nothing less than Alejo's cousin, the man who ruined Lupita's life.
Despite all the setbacks, the impossibility of coexistence and the crazy crosses between rich and poor, love between Lupita and Miguel Ángel arises with a force that neither can stop, and that force causes that with the entire time everything seems to be irreconcilable begins to have a why.
This is how they deeply hate each other, the Menchaca and the Ruizpalacios become part of the same side with one goal in common: to help Miguel Ángel recover everything he lost in exchange for the club and the house to stay with the Menchaca .
Everything seems to go on wheels until obstacles happen such as when Alejo attacks with all his arms to destroy Lupita, claiming paternity of his son, who he wants to take over as he may; Minerva who has always been in love with Miguel Ángel and only wants Alejo for his money, will stand in the love that begins to appear between Lupita and Miguel Ángel using various tricks with his mother to keep the money of Alejo and claim the love of Miguel Ángel.

Cast

Main 
 Jaime Camil as Miguel Ángel Ruizpalacios Romagnoli 
 Zuria Vega  as María Guadalupe Menchaca Martínez 
 Mark Tacher as Alejo Ruizpalacios Saravia
 Arturo Peniche as Nepomuceno Escandiondas
 Ingrid Martz as Minerva Fontanet Blanco

Secondary 
 Manuel "Flaco" Ibáñez as Jesús Menchaca
 Zaide Silvia Gutiérrez as Carmelita de Menchaca
 Tiaré Scanda as Vilma Terán Sade
 Agustín Arana as Saúl Ballesteros
 Gabriela Zamora as La Güendy de Escandiondas
 Raquel Pankowsky as Isela Blanco
 Queta Lavat as Matilde Álvarez de Ruizpalacios
 Natasha Dupeyrón as Frida Ruizpalacios Romagnoli 
 Gaby Mellado as Macarena Larrea Condesa de Valladolid
 Diego de Erice as Leonardo Ruizpalacios Romagnoli 
 Jonathan Becerra as José Tizoc Menchaca Martínez
 Álex Perea as Tomás
 Abril Rivera as Perla Ivette Menchaca Martínez
 José Pablo Minor as Tato
 José Eduardo Derbez as Diego Armando Escandiondas
 Jacqueline García as Jennifer
 Ricardo Margaleff as Jonathan
 Manuel Guízar as Salomón
 Homero Ferruzca as Brandon
 Gustavo Rojo as Aureliano
 Roberto Blandón as Adolfo
 Rebeca Mankita as Genóveva
 Lorena Velázquez as Isabel
 Polo Ortín as Flavio
 Luis Gatica as Osiel
 Moisés Suárez
 Silvia Pasquel as Ana Sofía Romagnoli Tolentino de Ruizpalacios
 Mark Tacher as Alejo Ruiz Palacios Zarabia

Guest 
 Mariana Karr as Covadonga
 Gabriel Soto as Himself
Cecilia Gabriela as Rita

Awards and nominations

References

External links 
 

Mexican telenovelas
2013 telenovelas
Televisa telenovelas
2013 Mexican television series debuts
2014 Mexican television series endings
Mexican LGBT-related television shows
Mexican television series based on Colombian television series
Spanish-language telenovelas